Aquimarina algicola  is a bacterium from the genus of Aquimarina.

References 

Flavobacteria
Bacteria described in 2021